Do Hezar Rural District is a rural district (dehestan) in Khorramabad District, Tonekabon County, Mazandaran Province, Iran. At the 2006 census, its population was 1,494, in 475 families. The rural district has 20 villages.

References 

Rural Districts of Mazandaran Province
Tonekabon County